Union Township is a township in Jackson County, Iowa, USA.

History
Union Township was established in 1840.

References

Townships in Jackson County, Iowa
Townships in Iowa
1840 establishments in Iowa Territory